"A Msterdamn" is a song by Dutch music producer and DJ Afrojack in collaboration with Dutch DJ-team the Partysquad. The single was released digitally on 10 May 2010 in the Netherlands.

Music video
The music video was released on March 27, 2010 on the official Spinnin' Records YouTube channel.  It shows two people having an evening of alcohol, illegal parties, marijuana and cocaine until, at the end of the film, they are beaten to death by a gangster.

Track listing

Chart performance

Release history

References

2010 singles
The Partysquad songs
Afrojack songs
Songs written by Afrojack
2010 songs
Spinnin' Records singles